Predrag Peruničić (born 27 June 1967) is a Serbian former handball player.

Club career
Over the course of his career that spanned 20 years, Peruničić played for Partizan on four separate occasions, winning three national championships (1992–93, 2001–02, and 2002–03) and three national cups (1992–93, 1997–98, and 2000–01). He also won a domestic double with Crvena zvezda (1995–96) and Vojvodina (2004–05).

International career
At international level, Peruničić represented FR Yugoslavia in two major tournaments, winning the bronze medal at the 1996 European Championship.

Personal life
Peruničić is the older brother of fellow handball player Nenad Peruničić.

Honours
Partizan
 Handball Championship of FR Yugoslavia: 1992–93, 2001–02, 2002–03
 Handball Cup of FR Yugoslavia: 1992–93, 1997–98, 2000–01
Crvena zvezda
 Handball Championship of FR Yugoslavia: 1995–96, 1996–97
 Handball Cup of FR Yugoslavia: 1995–96
Vojvodina
 Serbia and Montenegro Handball Super League: 2004–05
 Serbia and Montenegro Handball Cup: 2004–05

References

External links
 

1967 births
Living people
Sportspeople from Pljevlja
Serbs of Montenegro
Yugoslav male handball players
Serbia and Montenegro male handball players
Serbian male handball players
RK Crvenka players
RK Partizan players
RK Crvena zvezda players
RK Vojvodina players
Handball-Bundesliga players
Expatriate handball players
Serbia and Montenegro expatriate sportspeople in Germany